Massee Lane Gardens (9 acres) are botanical gardens focusing on camellias, located at the American Camellia Society headquarters, 100 Massee Lane, Fort Valley, Georgia. They are open to the public for an admission fee.

The gardens were originally created by David C. Strother in the 1930s within the  property around his farm house. In 1966, he donated his property to the American Camellia Society. Its headquarters building was completed in 1968 and named in his honor. The T. J. Smith Memorial Greenhouse was constructed in 1969, and now houses some 200 camellia plants.

Today the gardens contain more than 1,000 varieties of camellia, as well as the Abendroth Japanese Garden with tea house and koi fish, the Environmental Garden featuring plants native to the southeastern United States, the Scheibert Rose Garden with more than 150 roses, and plantings of azaleas, chrysanthemums, daffodils, daphnes, daylilies, and more.

The Annabelle Lundy Fetterman Educational Museum in the visitor center features a large collection of Boehm porcelain. The visitor center also includes a slide show about the gardens, a gift shop, auditorium and reception room.

Photo gallery

See also 
 List of botanical gardens in the United States

External links 
 
 

Botanical gardens in Georgia (U.S. state)
Flora of Georgia (U.S. state)
Museums in Peach County, Georgia
Decorative arts museums in the United States
Art museums and galleries in Georgia (U.S. state)
Protected areas of Peach County, Georgia